Pir Samadin (also Romanized as Pīr Şamadīn; also known as Pīr Şadīn and Pīr Seyyed Āḥmed) is a village in Kashkan Rural District, Shahivand District, Dowreh County, Lorestan Province, Iran. At the 2006 census, its population was 199, in 40 families.

References 

Towns and villages in Dowreh County